Bereket is both a given name and a surname. Notable people with the name include:

Bereket Mengisteab, Eritrean singer-songwriter
Bereket Selassie, Eritrean academic
Bereket Simon, Ethiopian politician
Adem Bereket, Turkish wrestler

See also
Bereket (disambiguation)
Bereket, Japanese independent Record label run by Phew (singer)  

Turkish-language surnames